Maroussi B.C. alternately translated as Marousi, Amaroussi, or Amaroussion, is a professional basketball club that is based in Marousi, a northern suburb of Athens, in Greece. The club's full name is Gymnastikos Syllogos Maroussi Basketball Club, which is commonly abbreviated as G.S. Maroussi B.C.

The club has played for many years in the top-tier level Greek Basket League. The club currently plays in the Greek 2nd Division.

History

1950–1998

The multi-sports club Gymnastikos Syllogos Amarousiou (Amarousi Sports Club) was founded in 1896, the same year that Maroussi native Spyridon Louis won the Olympic marathon at the 1896 Summer Olympics. The club's men's basketball section started in 1950.

The basketball section played in the Greek minor leagues for the first two decades of its existence. It reached the Greek top division, the A National Category (Alpha League) in 1969, where it played for one season before being relegated.

In the 1970s, the club was led by Nikos Darivas at point guard and Dimitris Fosses at center, and starting with the 1971–72 season, the club played in the Greek top division for all but one year of the following decade. Maroussi qualified for the European third-tier level FIBA Korać Cup's 1978–79 season.

The club was then relegated after the 1980–81 season, and alternated between the second-tier level A2 League and the third-tier level B League for the next 18 years.

1998–2010
Maroussi was promoted back up to the Greek First Division for the 1998–99 season, and moved from the Spiros Louis Gym to the newly constructed Maroussi Saint Thomas Indoor Hall.

Maroussi won the title of the European second-tier level FIBA Saporta Cup, during the 2000–01 season. That team was coached by Vangelis Alexandris, and it featured the inside-outside scoring tandem of Jimmy Oliver and Ashraf Amaya, as well as the rebounding skills of Vassil Evtimov. Maroussi became the sixth Greek team to win a European continental-wide title.

The club at this time received financial backing from Greek businessman Aris Vovos.

The club then played in the second-tier level FIBA Saporta Cup, and its successor, the EuroCup, the third-tier level FIBA Korać Cup, and the fourth-tier level FIBA Europe Champions Cup. Maroussi reached the final of the third-tier level FIBA Europe League's (later called FIBA EuroChallenge) 2003–04 season, but they lost in the final to the Russian club UNICS Kazan. In the Greek Cup, Maroussi reached the Greek Cup Final Four in the 1999–00 season and the Greek Cup Final in the 2001–02 season.

Under the club's head coach at the time, Panagiotis Giannakis, and with the young star play-maker of the club at the time, Vassilis Spanoulis (recipient of the Greek League Best Young Player and Greek League Most Improved Player awards in 2003 and 2004), the club finished in second place in the 2003–04 regular season, with a 21–5 record. It then beat Peristeri and AEK Athens, which had been the league's runner-up the preceding year, and the league's champions the year before that, in the playoffs, before ultimately losing in the Greek League Finals to Panathinaikos.

In the 2004–05 season, the club was second in the Greek League regular season again, and finished fourth in the league overall, after postseason losses to AEK Athens in the semifinals, and Panionios in the 3rd place playoff series.

Spanoulis then moved to Panathinaikos in the summer of 2005. In the 2005–06 season, Maroussi finished the regular season in third place, behind Panathinaikos and Olympiacos, and was subsequently defeated Olympiacos in the playoff semifinals. Maroussi then lost the 3rd place playoff series against Aris. In that season's Greek Cup, they were beaten in the Greek Cup Final.

Coach Giannakis then left Maroussi in 2006, to concentrate on managing the senior men's Greek national basketball team. In the following 2006–07 season, the Maroussi side finished the regular season in 8th place, and reached the first round of the playoffs, where they lost to Panathinaikos.

In the 2007–08 season, Soulis Markopoulos joined the team as its new head coach, and Maroussi finished in 6th place in the regular season. In the playoffs, Maroussi beat Aris in the first round, and then took Olympiacos to a 5th and deciding game in the semi-finals, which Maroussi lost by just one point (64–63). The team then lost the 3rd place playoff series to Panionios.

Under head coach Markopoulos (who was Greek League Coach of the Year in 2008), Maroussi finished in 4th place in the Greek Basket League 2008–09 regular season. They then beat Panellinios in the first round of the playoffs, before losing to Olympiacos in the playoff semifinals. However, they won the 3rd place playoff series against Aris, and thus qualified for the European top-tier level EuroLeague.

In 2010, Markopoulos left Maroussi for PAOK, and he and was replaced as the team's head coach by Georgios Bartzokas, a former Maroussi player.

Maroussi beat fellow Greek League club Aris, and the German League club Alba Berlin, in the EuroLeague 2009–10 season's Qualifying Round, to reach the regular season group stage of the competition. In the EuroLeague's Group C, they beat the Israeli League club Maccabi Tel Aviv at home, and reached the EuroLeague Top 16 Phase, where they beat fellow Greek club Panathinaikos and the Adriatic League club Partizan Belgrade, while playing home games at the Nikos Galis Olympic Indoor Hall.

In the 2009–10 season, Maroussi finished the regular season in third place. They then beat Kolossos in the first round of the playoffs, but they were then beaten in the semi-final of the playoffs by Olympiacos. In the 3rd place playoff series, they beat Panellinios, to again qualify for the next season of the EuroLeague.

Maroussi player Kostas Kaimakoglou was selected to the Greek League Best Five team, and Georgios Bartzokas became the third Maroussi head coach in five years to receive the Greek League's Best Coach award.

2010–present

The club's decline
Club President Aris Vovos left the club during the 2010 off-season, leaving a big gap in the club's finances. After a consortium led by Giorgos Gamaris and Thanasis Maris, failed to gain control of the club, its ownership reverted to the club's amateur section in October.

The team was then only allowed to be registered to the top-tier level Greek Basket League's 2010–11 season on appeal. The player's union criticized the club for late salary payments. The EuroLeague revoked the club's licence to play in the Qualifying Rounds of the competition.
The former Panathinaikos club football player Vasilis Konstantinou, a Marousi native who had played youth basketball with the team, was named Team President in October. Head coach Vangelis Alexandris returned to replace the departing Bartzokas, whilst experienced players such as Nestoras Kommatos, Ioannis Gagaloudis, and Dimitrios Charitopoulos were brought into the team to form a new squad following a player exodus.
Maroussi finished the 2010–11 season in 5th place in the regular season standings. They lost in the first round of the playoffs to Aris. By finishing in the top 5 in the Greek League, they qualified for the next season's edition of the European 2nd-tier level EuroCup, but they were not permitted to participate in the competition, due to financial issues.

In May 2011, Maroussi was ordered by FIBA's Basketball Arbitral Tribunal (BAT) to pay thousands of euros to former player Jared Homan in unpaid salaries and bonuses. Maroussi was unable to pay Homan, or Georgios Diamantopoulos, who won a similar ruling against the club in August of that year. Due to this, the club was then banned by FIBA from being able to register any new players in the Greek League, in November 2011. A temporary financial agreement with Homan, led to the suspension of the ban on registering any new players for one day, during which Frank Elegar was recruited to the club.

Nikos Linardos became the team's new head coach for the 2011–12 season, which began with a long losing streak, despite Maroussi player Nestoras Kommatos being one of the league's top scorers, and Maroussi player Ioannis Gagaloudis being one of the league's assists leaders.

The team's financial crisis deepened. Gagaloudis, Kommatos, Charitopoulos, and Elegar all left the club, due to unpaid salaries. Teenagers from the club's youth team, such as Dimitrios Agravanis and Lampros Tsontzos, were then moved into the team's starting five for Greek League games. The club was also prohibited from selling any tickets to home games, due to unpaid taxes, and it ceased paying its players and training staff. 
Maroussi finished the 2011–12 season with a 1–23 regular season record, winning their only game of the season against Peristeri, another team that was suffering from financial problems at the time.

Due to going into bankruptcy, the club was then demoted to the third-tier level semi-professional competition, the Greek B League, for the 2012–13 season. The club was then demoted to the fourth-tier level Greek C League, for the 2015–16 season.

For the 2016–17 season, the club was promoted up to the Greek B League. Then, for the 2017–18 season, the club was promoted up to the second-tier level Greek A2 League. In the 2019–20 season, the club played in the Greek 3rd Division, and in the 2020–21 season, the club played in the Greek 2nd Division.

Arenas

Maroussi plays its national domestic home games at the 1,700 seat capacity Maroussi Saint Thomas Indoor Hall, which is leased to the club by the municipality of Marousi. The club played its EuroLeague home games in Panathinaikos BC Arena which is Nikos Galis Olympic Indoor Hall.

Honours and titles
 FIBA Saporta Cup
  Winners (1): 2001

Seasons

Notable players

Greece:
  Georgios Bartzokas
  Marios Batis
  Nikos Boudouris
 - Pat Calathes
  Kostas Charalampidis
  Nikos Darivas
  Georgios Diamantopoulos
  Alexis Falekas
  Dimitris Fosses
  Andreas Glyniadakis
  Kostas Kaimakoglou
  Georgios Karagkoutis
 - John Korfas
  Angelos Koronios
  Fanis Koumpouras
  Alexis Kyritsis
  Nikos Liakopoulos
  Dimitris Marmarinos
  Dimitris Mavroeidis
  Loukas Mavrokefalidis
 - Igor Milošević
 - Makis Nikolaidis
 - Pete Papachronis
  Spyros Panteliadis
  Michalis Pelekanos
  Grigoris Rallatos
  Vassilis Spanoulis
  Tzanis Stavrakopoulos
  Vangelis Vourtzoumis
  Pavlos Xydas

Europe:
  Stephen Arigbabu
 - Roderick Blakney
  Pat Burke
 - Vasco Evtimov
  Ivan Grgat
 - Jared Homan
  Michael Koch
  Branko Milisavljević
  Stevan Nađfeji
  Nikolay Padius
  Oliver Popović
  Renaldas Seibutis
  Blagota Sekulić
  Aleksandar Smiljanić
 - Anatoly Zourpenko

USA:
  Danya Abrams
 - Lance Allred
  Ashraf Amaya
  Junior Burrough
  Travon Bryant
  Marty Conlon
  Jamon Gordon
  Andre Hutson
  Billy Keys
  Erik Meek
  Jimmy Oliver
  Chris Owens
 - Bill Phillips
  Craig Robinson
  Dickey Simpkins
  Larry Stewart
  Donell Taylor
 - Chris Thomas
  Andy Toolson
 - Henry Turner

Rest of Americas:
 - Levon Kendall

Oceania:
 - Mark Dickel

Maroussi players that played in the NBA

  Ashraf Amaya
 - Lance Allred
  Pat Burke
  Junior Burrough
  Marty Conlon
  Andreas Glyniadakis
  Jimmy Oliver
  Chris Owens
  Dickey Simpkins
  Vassilis Spanoulis
  Larry Stewart
  Donell Taylor
  Andy Toolson
 / Henry Turner

Head coaches
  Kostas Petropoulos
  Vangelis Alexandris
  Nikos Linardos
  Panagiotis Giannakis
  Darko Russo
  Soulis Markopoulos
  Georgios Bartzokas
  Kostas Keramidas

Sponsorship names
 Telestet: (2001–03)
 TIM: (2003–04)
 Honda: (2004–07)
 Costa Coffee: (2007–09)

References

External links
Official website 
"Maroussi BC at.", RealGM. Retrieved on 28 April 2015.
"Maroussi BC at", Eurobasket.com. Retrieved on 28 April 2015.
"Maroussi (Team History -  EuroCup 2008) at.", FIBA Europe. Retrieved on 14 April 2015.

 
Basketball teams established in 1950
Basketball teams in Greece
Marousi